Jacob Alexander Davenport (born 28 December 1998) is an English professional footballer who plays as a midfielder for Stockport County.

Davenport began his career with the youth team of Manchester City, making his professional debut on loan at Burton Albion. He later played with Blackburn Rovers, Lincoln City and Stockport County.

Career
Davenport moved on loan from Manchester City to Burton Albion in January 2018. He made his senior debut on 3 February 2018, and scored his first senior goal on 20 February 2018.

On 2 July 2018, Davenport signed for Blackburn Rovers on a four-year contract. His first two seasons were marred by injury, but he began playing towards the end of the 2019–20 season. He scored his first goal for Blackburn on 5 December 2020, a late equaliser in a 2–2 draw at  Brentford.

On 20 May 2022, Blackburn announced Davenport would be departing the club upon the expiration of his contract on 30 June, with the club opting against offering the player a new deal. Davenport had a trial spell with Scottish club Hearts in August 2022, but they decided not to offer him a contract.

On 13 September 2022, Davenport joined Lincoln City on a short-term contract until January 2023. He made his debut in the EFL Trophy against Doncaster Rovers on 20 September 2022. He left the club on the 13 January 2023 following the expiration of his contract.

On 20th February 2023, Davenport joined Stockport County on a short term deal until the end of the season.

Career statistics

References

1998 births
Living people
English footballers
Manchester City F.C. players
Burton Albion F.C. players
Blackburn Rovers F.C. players
Lincoln City F.C. players
Stockport County F.C. players
English Football League players
Association football midfielders